The Swedish football league system is a series of interconnected leagues for club football in Sweden which is controlled by the Swedish Football Association and consists of 288 teams in 22 leagues divided into five levels. Below those five levels, additional regional levels numbered six to ten exist but these lower leagues are controlled by the regional associations and not by the nationwide association. There is, however, promotion and relegation to and from all levels. , there were a total of 2510 teams in the Swedish league system of which 299 of them were reserve teams.

Current system in men's football

2019
The table below shows how the current system works. For each division, its Swedish name and number of clubs is given. It is not certain that each division is a feeder of teams to the division that lie directly above it and relegates teams to the divisions that lie directly below it, even though this usually is the case. As of the 2018 season, both Norra and Södra leagues of Ettan are composed of 16 clubs, similar to Allsvenskan and Superettan. For level 6 to level 9, the number of clubs are as of 2013.

Current system in women's football
In 2013 the two second tier divisions were combined in the new Elitettan.

References

 
Football league systems in Europe